Tsipikan is a rural locality (a settlement) in Bauntovsky District, Republic of Buryatia, Russia. The population was 69 as of 2010. There are 5 streets.

Geography 
Kurort Baunt is the nearest rural locality.

References 

Rural localities in Bauntovsky District